The Never Ending Tour is the popular name for Bob Dylan's endless touring schedule since June 7, 1988.

Tour
The 2004 tour started with a spring tour of the United States. Dylan performed several residencies during the tour. Including
 3 shows in St. Louis.
 2 shows in Milwaukee
 3 shows in Detroit
 3 shows at the Avalon Ballroom in Boston
 3 shows at The Tabernacle in Atlanta
 4 shows in Chicago although at four different venues
 3 shows in Toronto although at three different venues
 3 shows in Washington, D.C. although at three different venues
 2 shows in Philadelphia although at two different venues
Dylan's European summer tour started on June 18 with a concert in Cardiff, Wales. Two days later Dylan performed in Finsbury Park, London, England as part of the Fleadh Festival. Dylan only performed two dates in England, the second in Newcastle was performed two days later. He then went on to perform two shows in Glasgow, Scotland. One at the SE&CC and the second at Barrowland Ballroom. This show was added due to the ticket demands at the previous night's concert at the SE&CC. The tour finished 31 days after it started on July 18 in Caminha, Portugal.

Dylan went on to perform a Baseball Park tour of the Eastern United States. The concerts were a double-bill with Willie Nelson. Then on October 13 Dylan commenced the final leg of the tour performing in College sports venues across the United States. The tour started on October 13 in San Francisco and ended in Allston, Massachusetts, on November 21.

Tour dates

Festivals and other miscellaneous performances

<small>
This concert was a part of "Bonnaroo Music Festival"
This concert was a part of "Fleadh Festival"
This concert was a part of "Jazz & Joy-Festival"
This concert was a part of "Montauban Festival de Jazz"
This concert was a part of "International Arts Festival"
This concert was a part of "Xacobeo Festival 2004"
This concert was a part of "Vilar de Mouros Festival"

Cancellations and rescheduled shows

Box office score data

References

External links

BobLinks – Comprehensive log of concerts and set lists
Bjorner's Still on the Road – Information on recording sessions and performances

Bob Dylan concert tours
2004 concert tours